Operário Esporte Clube, commonly known as Operário, is a Brazilian football club based in Manacapuru, Amazonas state.

History
The club was founded on June 10, 1982. Operário won the Campeonato Amazonense Second Level in 2010.

Achievements

 Campeonato Amazonense Second Level:
 Winners (1): 2010

Stadium
Operário Esporte Clube play their home games at Estádio Olímpico Municipal Gilberto Mestrinho, nicknamed Gilbertão. The stadium has a maximum capacity of 15,000 people.

References

Association football clubs established in 1982
Football clubs in Amazonas (Brazilian state)
1982 establishments in Brazil